Ramasamy Subramaniam (24 October 1939 – 27 February 2022) was a Malaysian middle-distance runner. He competed in the 800 metres at the 1964 Summer Olympics and the 1968 Summer Olympics. In 1976, he was awarded the Officer of the Order of the Defender of the Realm (K.M.N.) in Malaysia.

Subramaniam died after being hospitalized due to chest pain, at Kajang Hospital, on 27 February 2022, at the age of 82.

References

External links

1939 births
2022 deaths
Place of birth missing
Athletes (track and field) at the 1964 Summer Olympics
Athletes (track and field) at the 1968 Summer Olympics
Malaysian male middle-distance runners
Olympic athletes of Malaysia
Athletes (track and field) at the 1962 British Empire and Commonwealth Games
Commonwealth Games competitors for Malaya
Athletes (track and field) at the 1966 British Empire and Commonwealth Games
Commonwealth Games competitors for Malaysia
Athletes (track and field) at the 1962 Asian Games
Athletes (track and field) at the 1966 Asian Games
Asian Games silver medalists for Malaysia
Asian Games medalists in athletics (track and field)
Medalists at the 1966 Asian Games
Officers of the Order of the Defender of the Realm
Southeast Asian Games medalists in athletics
Southeast Asian Games gold medalists for Malaysia
Southeast Asian Games silver medalists for Malaysia